Pawan Kumar Jaiswal is an Indian politician from Bharatiya Janata Party, Bihar and a two term Member of Bihar Legislative Assembly. Jaiswal had won from Dhaka in 2010 as an independent and on a BJP ticket in 2020.

References 

1976 births
Living people
Bihar MLAs 2020–2025
Bharatiya Janata Party politicians from Bihar
Bihar MLAs 2010–2015